Charles "Chicka" Dixon (5 May 1928 – 10 March 2010) was an Australian Aboriginal activist and leader.

He was active in campaigns around the 1967 referendum and the Aboriginal Tent Embassy, dedicating his life to the fight for basic human rights and justice for Aboriginal and Torres Strait Islander people.

In 1970 Dixon was instrumental in establishing Australia's first Aboriginal Legal Service in Redfern; he co-founded the Tent Embassy in Canberra in 1972. He was the first Aboriginal person to be appointed as a Councillor on the Australia Council and is a former Chairman of the Council's Aboriginal Arts Board. In 1983 Dixon was named the first Aboriginal of the Year.

Dixon attended his first political meeting on his 18th birthday in 1946. Inspired by Jack Patten, an organiser of the 1938 Day of Mourning and the Aborigines Progressive Association, he has been politically active ever since. During the 1960s he was spokesperson for the Federal Council for the Advancement of Aborigines and Torres Strait Islanders.

In 1972 he travelled to China to highlight the Aboriginal struggle in an attempt to shame the Australian Government into action. Qantas would not fly the group, so Dixon found an airline that would.

In 2006 he was awarded an Honorary Doctorate of Letters for his eminent service to the community by the University of New South Wales.

During his seventies, he dealt with asbestos poisoning, a legacy from his working days on the Sydney docks as a wharfie.

On 5 November 2007, reports appeared in the Sydney Morning Herald and Brisbane Times claiming Dixon had obtained 150 pages of his ASIO File. The files are, Dixon says, wildly inaccurate. Dixon joins activists Charles Perkins, Faith Bandler, Melbourne academic Gary Foley, author Michael Hyde and ABC's Phillip Adams in being among those who have obtained their ASIO files and openly spoken about their files in mainstream media. Part of Dixon's story can be read in the Brisbane Times article and listened to in an SMH multimedia clip, which shows images of the files themselves.

Death
Dixon died at a Sydney nursing home on 20 March 2010 from asbestosis, which the Maritime Union of Australia (MUA) says he contracted as a wharf worker. He is survived by his two daughters, Rhonda and Christine, his brothers and sisters, nieces, nephews, grandchildren and extended family.

References

External links
 Interview with Chicka Dixon Mura Gadi National Library Australia 5–12 May 1995 Interviewed by Gary Foley

1928 births
2010 deaths
Australian indigenous rights activists
Deaths from lung disease
History of Indigenous Australians
Australian waterside workers